Toronto West, also known as West Toronto, was a provincial riding that was created in Toronto, Ontario when the country of Canada was established in 1867. At the time Toronto was divided into two ridings, West Toronto and East Toronto. In 1886, these ridings were dissolved and a combined riding of the entire city was created which elected three members. In 1894 this riding was split into four parts of which Toronto West was one. It occupied the western part of the old city of Toronto. From 1908 to 1914 it elected two members to the legislature. In 1914 the riding was abolished and reformed into three new ridings called Toronto Southwest, Toronto Northwest and Parkdale.

Boundaries
In 1867, when the province of Ontario was established, two ridings were created to represent the city of Toronto. Toronto West was created from the city wards of St. John, St. Andrew, St. Patrick and St. George.

In 1886 the riding was abolished and a single riding called Toronto, representing the entire city was created which elected three members to the legislature.

The riding was re-formed in 1894. In the second incarnation, the boundaries were Lake Ontario to the south between Palmerston Avenue in the east and the city limits in the west. The northern boundary was the city limits which was formed by the Grand Trunk Railway right-of-way.

In 1914, the riding was split between the new ridings of Toronto Southwest, Toronto Northwest and Parkdale.

Members of Provincial Parliament

Election results

1867-1886

1894-1914

Seat A

Seat B

References

Notes

Citations

Former provincial electoral districts of Ontario
Provincial electoral districts of Toronto